Woman-Proof is a 1923 American silent comedy film directed by Alfred E. Green and written by Thomas J. Geraghty based upon a play by George Ade. The film stars Thomas Meighan, Lila Lee, John St. Polis, Louise Dresser, Robert Agnew, Mary Astor, and Edgar Norton. The film was released on October 28, 1923, by Paramount Pictures.

Cast

Preservation
With no prints of Woman-Proof located in any film archives, it is a lost film.

References

External links

Lobby card at the Walter Film Poster and Photo Museum

1923 films
1920s English-language films
Silent American comedy films
1923 comedy films
Paramount Pictures films
Films directed by Alfred E. Green
American black-and-white films
Lost American films
American silent feature films
1923 lost films
Lost comedy films
1920s American films